Tatiana Shadrina (born 20 April 1974 in Kstovo) is a Russian chess player, and a woman grandmaster.

She played in the Women's World Chess Championship 2010, she made it to the second round where she was beaten by Dronavalli Harika.

She has played in the Women's European Individual Chess Championship in 2009 and 2013.

External links

Living people
1974 births
Chess woman grandmasters
Russian female chess players
People from Nizhny Novgorod Oblast
21st-century Russian women